Mario Chiesa (born in Milan, December 12, 1944) is an Italian former politician and member of the Italian Socialist Party. In 1992 Chiesa was arrested on charges of corruption, leading to the mani pulite trials, and eventually to a restructuring of Italian politics. In 2009 he was arrested again, under charges related to waste treatment in Milan.

Notes 

1944 births
Living people
Politicians from Milan
Italian Socialist Party politicians